Clytus George "Cy" Bentley (November 23, 1850 – February 26, 1873) was an American Major League Baseball pitcher who played one season in professional baseball, for the  Middletown Mansfields of the National Association.

Career
Born in East Haven, Connecticut, Bentley played his only season in professional baseball for the  Middletown Mansfields.  Bentley was the primary starting pitcher for the Mansfields, starting 17 of their 24 games and completing 16 of them.  He gave up 285 baserunners (273 hits and 12 walks), 252 runs, 105 of them were earned.  For the season he won 2, lost 15, and had an ERA of 6.14, in 144 innings pitched.  Bentley's two victories came against the Cleveland Forest Citys (10-5) and the Washington Nationals (28-23), both in the month of May.

Death
Bentley, an iron moulder during the off-season, died on February 26, 1873, 6½ months after the end of the 1872 season, of consumption in Middletown, Connecticut, and is interred at the Church of the Holy Trinity.

See also
 List of baseball players who died during their careers

References

External links

1850 births
1872 deaths
19th-century baseball players
Baseball players from New Haven, Connecticut
19th-century deaths from tuberculosis
Tuberculosis deaths in Connecticut
Major League Baseball pitchers
Middletown Mansfields players
Moldmakers